808 is Taiwanese Mandopop artist Will Pan's eighth studio album. It was released by Universal Music Taiwan on 14 January 2011. A second edition, 808 (Limited Edition) (CD+DVD) (808全球限量盤) was released on 11 February 2011 containing a bonus DVD with four music videos and "全面通緝" (Totally Wanted) feature version (一刀未剪從[全面通緝]電影版).

The album debuted at number one on Taiwan's G-Music Weekly Top 20 Mandarin and Combo Charts; and Five Music Chart at week 3 with a percentage sales of 26.38%, 13.47%, and 26.93% respectively. It peaked at number one for three weeks on Mandarin and Combo Charts and two weeks on the Five Music Chart.

The tracks, "UUU" is listed on the Top 20 Gold Songs of the (January to June) 2011 Global Chinese Golden Chart.

Background
808 was named after a model of drum machines that were considered popular in the 1980s. 808 was also derived from his birth date, August 1980 and it is also his 8th album. The music videos were released on the Universal Music Taiwan Channel on YouTube, the first lead track was, "Most Wanted" and the second lead track is, "U U U". Another two music videos for, "小小螞蟻" (Small Ant) and "觸動" (Touch) were also released. The former was featured in the Taiwanese drama, Ti Amo Chocolate's soundtrack, while the latter music video features Nichkhun of Korean boy band 2PM and it is a remix of "Pas de Deux (Shuang Ren Wu)". It also features the opening theme song, "我們都怕痛" (We Are All Afraid of Pain), of Taiwanese drama "Endless Love" (愛∞無限), starring Pan and Sandrine Pinna.

Track listing

Music videos
 "全面通緝" (Most Wanted) MV
 "U U U" MV
 "小小螞蟻" (Small Ant) MV
 "觸動" (Touch) MV
 "我們都怕痛" (We Are All Afraid of Pain) MV

Notes

References

External links
  Will Pan discography@Universal Music Taiwan

Will Pan albums
2011 albums
Universal Music Taiwan albums